Pygopidae is an extinct family of brachiopods.

References 

  Paleobiology Database

Terebratulida
Prehistoric protostome families
Brachiopod families
Prehistoric brachiopods
Late Jurassic first appearances
Early Cretaceous extinctions